Epithema is a genus of plants in the family Gesneriaceae and subfamily Didymocarpoideae.  Species distribution records are mostly from western tropical Africa to Uganda, tropical and subtropical Asia.

Species

The Catalogue of Life lists:
 Epithema benthamii
 Epithema brunonis
 Epithema calcicola
 Epithema carnosum
 Epithema dentatum
 Epithema difforme
 Epithema dolichopodum
 Epithema horsfieldii
 Epithema involucratum
 Epithema longipetiolatum
 Epithema longitubum
 Epithema madulidii
 Epithema membranaceum
 Epithema parvibracteatum
 Epithema rennellense
 Epithema sarawakense
 Epithema saxatile
 Epithema steenisii
 Epithema strigosum
 Epithema taiwanense
 Epithema tenerum
 Epithema tenue
 Epithema zeylanicum

References

External links
 

Gesneriaceae genera
Didymocarpoideae